Taiwanofungus camphoratus, also known as stout camphor fungus, is a species of fungus that is endemic to Taiwan, where it grows only on the endemic tree Cinnamomum kanehirae, causing a brown heart rot.  Synonyms include Antrodia camphorata and Ganoderma camphoratum.

Genome

Recently, the 32.15 Mb genome containing 9,254 genes was sequenced.

Chemical constituents
Antcin B, antrodioxolanone, antrocamphin B, antroquinonol, antrocamphins, zhankuic acids, and other antcins have been reported as constituents of Taiwanofungus camphoratus.

Ecological concern
Because of its use as an herbal remedy, fruiting bodies of the fungus can fetch high prices. Good quality fruiting bodies were reported to cost as much as US$15,000/kg in 1997, before artificial cultivation methods were developed. Some have illegally farmed the fungus in the forests of Taiwan by hollowing out endangered stout camphor trees (Cinnamomum kanehirae  or niu zhang ).  This is despite the equal potency of T. camphotatus grown in a laboratory.

References

External links

Fungi described in 1990
Fungi of Taiwan
Fungal tree pathogens and diseases
Polyporales